Big Media or corporate media may refer to:
 Concentration of media ownership, the decreasing amount of separate media organisations
 Mainstream media, conventional news outlets
 Mass media, the term for modern media that use mass communication
 Media conglomerate, a company owning many media outlets

See also
 Big Media Publishers, South African communications company